Michaël Jérémiasz and Jayant Mistry defeated David Hall and Martin Legner in the final, 4–6, 6–3, 7–6 to win the inaugural gentlemen's doubles wheelchair tennis title at the 2005 Wimbledon Championships.

Draw

Finals

References

Men's Wheelchair Doubles
Wimbledon Championship by year – Wheelchair men's doubles